The 1984 Wake Forest Demon Deacons football team was an American football team that represented Wake Forest University during the 1984 NCAA Division I-A football season. In their fourth season under head coach Al Groh, the Demon Deacons compiled a 6–5 record and finished in fourth place in the Atlantic Coast Conference.

Schedule

A.Clemson was under NCAA probation, and was ineligible for the ACC title. Therefore this game did not count in the league standings.

Team leaders

References

Wake Forest
Wake Forest Demon Deacons football seasons
Wake Forest Demon Deacons football